The 2020 Mugello FIA Formula 2 round was a pair of motor races for Formula 2 cars that took place on 12-13 September 2020 at the Mugello Circuit in Mugello, Italy as part of the FIA Formula 2 Championship. It was the ninth round of the 2020 FIA Formula 2 Championship and ran in support of the 2020 Tuscan Grand Prix.

Report
Lundgaard achieved his first pole position in qualifying, but he was not successful in the race. For the first time since 2018 Sakhir Formula 2 round a team scored a one-two in the feature race with Mazepin first and Ghiotto second. Ghiotto also broke the record for the most podiums in Formula 2 history with 24. Both Ilott and Shwartzman failed to score points in the feature race, while Schumacher, by finishing in fifth, led the championship for the first time. 

The sprint race was won by Lundgaard ahead of Louis Delétraz and Jüri Vips. This was Vips' first podium in Formula 2. Finishing ahead of his closest rivals Ilott and Shwartzman, Mick Schumacher extended his championship lead.

Classification

Qualifying

Feature race 

Note：
 - Yuki Tsunoda originally finished the race in eighth place, but was given a five-second time penalty due to a collision with Dan Ticktum and ended up in sixteenth.

Sprint race

Standings after the event

Drivers' Championship standings

Teams' Championship standings

 Note: Only the top five positions are included for both sets of standings.

See also 
2020 Tuscan Grand Prix
2020 Mugello Formula 3 round

References

External links 
 

Mugello
Formula 2 Mugello
Auto races in Italy
Mugello Formula 2 round